Dasha Bláhová (born 8 March 1949) is a Czech-born actress, who became notable on Australian television in 1985 for her role in soap opera Neighbours as original character Maria Ramsay. She appeared in foreign film and after emigrating to Australia during the Communist era, she appeared in many television and film roles, she returned to her birth country in 1998 and again started appearing natively in film roles. Also credited as Dášha Bláhová.

Filmography
 Chyťte doktora (2007) .... Serafina Pustinová
 The Prince & Me (2004)
 Když chcípne pes (2004)
 Podzimní návrat '(2001)
 Canone inverso - Making Love (2000) .... Secretary Sophie
 Pasti, pasti, pastičky (1998)
 Vykání psovi (1998)
 Nexus 2.431 (1994)
 Muka obraznosti (1990)
 Sons of Steel (1989)
 Sands of the Bedouin (1988) (TV)
 Howling III (1987)
 Hungry Heart (1987)
 Funeral Going (1986) (TV)
 Neighbours (Maria Ramsay) (103 episodes)
 A Country Practice (appeared in episode 1)
 Displaced Persons (1984)
 Hoodwink (1981) (uncredited)
 Calamity (1981)
 Nechci nic slyšet (1978)
  Hra o jablko (1976)
 a pozdravuji vlaštovky (1972)

References

External links
 

1949 births
Australian soap opera actresses
Australian people of Czech descent
Czech soap opera actresses
Czechoslovak emigrants to Australia
Actors from Liberec
Living people